Agbiz may refer to:
Ağbiz, Azerbaijan
Agribusiness

See also 
 Agbis (disambiguation)